The Phone Call may refer to:

 The Phone Call (1977 film), produced by The Church of Jesus Christ of Latter-day Saints, about a young man trying work up courage to call a girl for a date
 The Phone Call (2013 film), about a woman in London takes a call on a Samaritans-type helpline
 "The Phone Call", a song by Joe Satriani from the album Flying in a Blue Dream

See also
 "The Telephone Call", a song by Kraftwerk